Anthidium vigintipunctatum is a species of bee in the family Megachilidae, the leaf-cutter, carder, or mason bees.

Distribution
Argentina
Peru

References

vigintipunctatum
Insects described in 1908